Prause is a surname. Notable people with the surname include:

Carl Prause (1893–1970), American football coach and college athletics administrator
Fritz Prause (born 1949), Austrian fencer
Kim Prause, American voice actress and theatre actress
Nicole Prause, American neuroscientist
Peter Prause (born  1943), German boxer
Richard Prause (born 1968), German table tennis player